Wrong Crowd is the second studio album by British singer-songwriter Tom Odell. It was released on 10 June 2016. Odell's first major release since his 2013 debut, Long Way Down, achieved international success, it was also his first album released via RCA Records.

Background
The album was announced on 4 April 2016, along with the release of its lead single, "Wrong Crowd". Odell also released a music video for the song on the same date, in addition to the announcement of a new tour. The album, released on 10 June 2016, was co-produced by Odell alongside Jim Abbiss, who has previously worked with artists like Arctic Monkeys, Kasabian and Adele. Regarding the concept and production of the new album, Odell said,I wanted the songs to sound big and dramatic; big strings and melodies emphasizing the songs further – rich in musicality and holding nothing back. The album follows a narrative of a man held at ransom by his childhood, yearning for it, yearning for nature- a desire for innocence in this perverse world in which he now lives. It’s a fictional story but the emotions and feelings are obviously ones I have felt – though the stories are elaborated and exaggerated. I wanted to create a world with a heightened sense of reality.

Promotion 
On 4 April 2016, Odell announced that he would go on tour and perform a series of intimate shows at venues across Europe and the United States in support of the album. Tickets for his shows, titled the No Bad Days Tour, completely sold out.

Track listing
Credits adapted from the album booklet.

Charts and certifications

Weekly charts

Year-end charts

Certifications

Release date

References

2016 albums
Tom Odell albums
Albums produced by Inflo
RCA Records albums
Albums produced by Jim Abbiss